Bobby Williams (born 24 November 1932) is an English footballer who played as an inside forward in the Football League for Chester.

References

1932 births
Living people
Sportspeople from Chester
Association football inside forwards
English footballers
New Brighton A.F.C. players
South Liverpool F.C. players
Chester City F.C. players
Runcorn F.C. Halton players
English Football League players